Doctor Detroit is a 1983 American comedy film directed by Michael Pressman with writing by Bruce Jay Friedman, Carl Gottlieb, and Robert Boris. The film stars Dan Aykroyd, Howard Hesseman, Lynn Whitfield, Fran Drescher, and Donna Dixon, with a special appearance by James Brown. It was the first film Aykroyd made after the death of John Belushi, and the first one in which he is not sharing top bill with other actors. Aykroyd and his co-star Dixon married soon after the film's release.

Plot
Introverted geek Clifford Skridlow (Dan Aykroyd) is a professor of comparative literature at the financially strapped Monroe College in Chicago.

Smooth Walker (Howard Hesseman), a pimp, owes $80,000 to "Mom" (Kate Murtagh), a gruff Chicago mob boss. Attempting to weasel out of his debt, Smooth invents a fictitious mobster, the flamboyant "Doctor Detroit", a ruthless chiropractor who allegedly is overrunning Smooth's turf. Smooth sees Clifford out to dinner alone at a restaurant, and decides to enlist him to pose as the "Doctor."  Smooth and his girls Monica (Donna Dixon), Jasmine (Lydia Lei), Karen (Fran Drescher), and Thelma (Lynn Whitfield), party with Clifford and give him the best night of his life. The next morning, during a faculty meeting, Clifford gets a phone call from the girls and learns about their troubles with Mom, that Smooth has skipped town, and that according to Smooth, they are now Clifford's girls. Clifford agrees to assume the persona of Doctor Detroit in an effort to help them out of their jam.

Meanwhile, Monroe College anticipates a corporate endowment from Rousehorn Consolidated Industries to be presented by its CEO, Harmon Rousehorn (Andrew Duggan). If the contribution is large enough, it will allow the college to remain open.

While Clifford is teaching classes, grading papers, catering a faculty party and assisting in hosting the visiting CEO, his Doctor Detroit alter ego has to find a way to get Thelma out of a solicitation charge, hold Mom at bay, and appear at the Players Ball to be proclaimed the new King of the Pimps while simultaneously appearing at Monroe College's annual Alumni Dinner. When Mom shows up at the Players Ball, she figures out that Doctor Detroit and Professor Skridlow are one and the same, and duels him with sword-length kebab skewers in front of the assembled academics. Mom is defeated, and the two functions combine into one joyous, spectacular party, as the ultimate fates of all are revealed, including Clifford's marriage to Karen.

Cast

Filming
The film was shot on location in Chicago and Evanston, Illinois, as well as at the University of Southern California and Biltmore Hotel in Los Angeles, California, during the summer of 1982.

Soundtrack

James Brown makes a cameo appearance in the film, performing "Get Up Offa That Thing/Dr. Detroit." Devo performed the "Theme from Doctor Detroit," which plays over the opening credits, as well as "Luv-Luv," and released an EP including both tracks and a longer dance remix of the theme song. A music video was also produced for the theme song, incorporating footage from the film.

A soundtrack album for the film was released on the labels Backstreet, MCA and WEA.

Track listing

Reception
The film received generally negative reviews from critics. Writing in the Chicago Tribune, critic Gene Siskel gave the film two and a half stars and called it "a mess, but a genial mess." Roger Ebert gave it three stars, saying it had "just a humble little screenplay" but also "a lot of funny moments" and a performance by Dan Aykroyd that showed "a lot of invention." Review aggregator Rotten Tomatoes reports that 33% of six critics have given the film a positive review.

In her autobiography, Enter Whining, Fran Drescher commented that Doctor Detroit was expected to be a major hit for the summer of 1983 but fell short of expectations, grossing $10.8 million on a budget of $8 million.

See also
 List of American films of 1983

References

External links
 
 
 
 
 

1983 films
1983 comedy films
American comedy films
American independent films
Backstreet Records albums
1980s English-language films
Films scored by Lalo Schifrin
Films about educators
Films about prostitution in the United States
Films directed by Michael Pressman
Films set in Chicago
Films set in universities and colleges
Films shot in Chicago
Films with screenplays by Bruce Jay Friedman
Films with screenplays by Carl Gottlieb
Universal Pictures films
Films produced by Robert K. Weiss
1980s American films